"White Noise" is a song by British electronic music duo Disclosure, featuring vocals from electronic music duo AlunaGeorge. It was released as a digital download in the United Kingdom on 1 February 2013. The song peaked at number two on the UK Singles Chart. The track is the second single from the duo's debut studio album, Settle (2013). The song was written by Howard Lawrence, Guy Lawrence, Aluna Francis, George Reid and James Napier.

Reception

Critical reception
The track was met with very positive reviews upon its release. Pitchfork labeled it "Best New Music". Robert Copsey of Digital Spy gave the song a positive review stating:

For their latest track 'White Noise' they've hooked up with trendy newbies AlunaGeorge – a savvy collaboration that's been carefully timed following their shared domination of last month's ones-to-watch lists. That's not to say it sounds forced; Disclosure's humming bassline, swirling synths and addictive clubby beeps are perfectly tailored to Aluna's pitched vocal. The result strikes a rarely-heard balance between hipster-friendly and potential chart-dominator. .
Freddie Holmes of The Underclassed gave the track a mixed review, stating that "It's a great track nonetheless, especially to someone that hasn't heard any of either group's previous material, but my superfan standpoint has rendered me to be overly critical".

Billboard named it the eighth greatest song of 2013. The website wrote about the song, "In a year in which Disclosure and AlunaGeorge watched their audiences and cultural cache grow exponentially, the two duos' wiry, icy-cool collaboration represented a high point for each".

Commercial performance
The song entered at number 28 on the UK Singles Chart. The following week, it climbed 26 places to number two on the chart, beaten to the top by "Thrift Shop" by Macklemore & Ryan Lewis, featuring Wanz.

Live performances
At the 2014 BRIT Awards, Disclosure and Lorde performed an electro version of Lorde's song "Royals", which transitioned into "White Noise", for which AlunaGeorge appeared on stage. The "Royals/White Noise" performance was released at iTunes Stores by the BRIT Awards on 19 February 2014; proceeds from its sales went to the charity War Child.

Music video 
The song's music video has a security guard and he starts in an abandoned warehouse.

Track listings
Digital download
"White Noise"  – 5:40

BRITs performance digital download
"Royals / White Noise" – 4:59

Charts and certifications

Weekly charts

Original version

"Royals/White Noise" (Live from the BRITs)

Year-end charts

Certifications

Release history

References

2013 singles
2013 songs
AlunaGeorge songs
Charity singles
Disclosure (band) songs
Island Records singles
Songs written by Jimmy Napes
Songs written by Guy Lawrence
Songs written by Howard Lawrence